Joseph ben Ḥayyim Hazan was a Sephardi ḥakham and chief rabbi of Jerusalem.

Life
Joseph Hazan was born at Smyrna in 1741 and  died at Jerusalem on November 11, 1819. At first rabbi in his native city, he went to Palestine in 1811, settling at Hebron, where he became rabbi. In 1813 he was elected chief rabbi of Jerusalem, which position he held until his death. His four sons, Elijah Raḥamim, Eliezer, Isaac, and Ḥayyim David, were all rabbinical scholars; one of his daughters became the mother of Ḥayyim Palaggi, chief rabbi of Smyrna. Another grandson was the Italian rabbi Israel Moses Hazan.

Works
 Ḥiqre Leb, responsa (vol. i., Salonica 1787, linked here; vol. ii., Livorno 1794; vols. iii.-viii., Salonica 1806-53)
 Ma'arkhe Leb, homilies (ib. 1821-22) 
 Ḥiqre Leb, Talmudic novellæ, edited by his great-grandson, Elijah (Jerusalem, 1880): one volume linked here

Jewish Encyclopedia bibliography

Solomon Hazan, Ha-Ma'alot li-Shelomoh, p. 43; 
Elijah Hazan, Zikron Yerushalayim, p. 131, Livorno 1874; 
La Buena Esperanza, Smyrna, 1896; 
Franco, Essai sur l'Histoire des Israélites de l'Empire Ottoman, etc., p. 127.

Sephardi rabbis in Ottoman Palestine
Smyrniote Jews
1741 births
1819 deaths